Out of the Flame is a children's historical novel by Eloise Lownsbery. Set in sixteenth-century France, at the court of Francis I, it describes the education and adventures of Pierre, who is training to be a knight. The novel, illustrated by Elizabeth Tyler Wolcott, was first published in 1931 and was a Newbery Honor recipient in 1932.

References

1931 American novels
Children's historical novels
American children's novels
Newbery Honor-winning works
Novels set in France
Fiction set in the 16th century
1931 children's books